Karim Abdraufovich Khakimov (28 December 1890 – 10 January 1938) was a Tatar revolutionary who became a diplomat for the Soviet Union. He was one of the first plenipotentiary representatives of Soviet Russia in the Arab world and made a significant contribution to the establishment of good relations between the newly established Soviet Republic and the Arab-Persian world, especially within the recently-unified Saudi Arabia. 
 
Khakimov joined the Russian Communist Party in April 1918 in Samara. He was executed in January 1938 during the Great Purge after being arrested on suspicion of subversive activity.
 

He was the subject of a biographic documentary, Russian Lawrence of Arabia: Life and death of Karim Khakimov 1892-1938 made by Radik Kudoyarov in 2010.

References

External Links 

Tatar revolutionaries
Tatar people executed by the Soviet Union
Great Purge victims
Soviet diplomats
Soviet Muslims
Ambassadors of the Soviet Union to Saudi Arabia
Ambassadors of the Soviet Union to Yemen
Members of the Communist Party of the Soviet Union executed by the Soviet Union